Friðarbogin is an organization working for LGBT rights in the Faroe Islands.

Friðarbogin was founded in 2003.

References

External links 
 Archived Friðarbogin website

LGBT organizations in the Faroe Islands